Juan B. Wandesforde (1817 - November 18, 1902) was an American painter. In 1872, he co-founded the San Francisco Art Association with Virgil Macey Williams. His work can be seen at the Laguna Art Museum.

References

1817 births
1902 deaths
English emigrants to the United States
People from Hayward, California
American male painters
Artists from San Francisco
Painters from California
19th-century American painters
19th-century American male artists
20th-century American painters
20th-century American male artists